Hugh Edmund Peter de Mel (17 June 1907 – 27 September 1992) was a Ceylonese politician.

Hugh Edmund Peter de Mel, was born 17 June 1907 in Moratuwa, the son of Cornelis Francis de Mel, and brother of Joseph Ford Francis, all of whom were key figures in the country's safety match industry. In 1929 de Mel established the Lanka Light Match factory in Moratuwa. He married Susima Swarnamalie née Dias, in 1931.

De Mel ran as the United National Party candidate at the 2nd parliamentary election, held between 24 May 1952 and 30 May 1952, in the Talawake electorate. He was successful polling 1,198 votes (54% of the total vote) 352 votes clear of his nearest rival.

At the subsequent 3rd parliamentary election, held between 5 April 1956 and 10 April 1956, de Mel chose to contest the seat of Moratuwa rather than Talawake. He was unsuccessful in his bid, losing to the Lanka Sama Samaja Party candidate, Meryl Fernando, by 7,718 votes. Fernando, a trade unionist, having earlier tried to organise workers at de Mel's match factory in 1945.

De Mel served on the Executive Council of the Ceylon National Chamber of Industries as Deputy Chairman for a number of years in the 1960s.

References

1907 births
1992 deaths
United National Party politicians
Members of the 2nd Parliament of Ceylon
De Mel family